Stephen Boxer (born 19 May 1950) is an English actor who has appeared in films, on television and on stage. He is known for his role as Joe Fenton on the BBC soap opera Doctors.

Career
Stephen Boxer was educated at New College School in Oxford, where he was a chorister, and Magdalen College School, Oxford.

He is perhaps best known for appearing as Joe Fenton in the BBC One daytime soap opera Doctors. He took a break from the show in mid-2008 to appear as Petruchio in the Royal Shakespeare Company production of The Taming of the Shrew, returning to soap for a few episodes in November 2010. For his portrayal of Joe, Boxer was nominated for the British Soap Award for Best Actor in 2007 and 2008.

He appeared in Zigger Zagger in 1967 with the National Youth Theatre.

Boxer has starred in a number of detective dramas, most notably in the second, third and fourth installments of Prime Suspect. On children's television, he was co-presenter of Get Up And Go! with Beryl Reid and its successor programme Mooncat and Co, where he was joined variously by the likes of Pat Coombs, Pam Ayres, Patsy Rowlands and Wilf Lunn. He had a featured role in the BBC docudrama A Royal Scandal. He played Mr Smith in the 2005 adaptation of Tom Brown's Schooldays and Lord Melville in Garrow's Law. He has also featured in episodes of Casualty, Luther, Midsomer Murders, Father Brown, The Honourable Woman and Humans.

In 2012, Boxer appeared as Francisco de Aguiar y Seijas in the RSC production of Helen Edmundson's The Heresy of Love. From May to October 2013, he played the title role in the RSC production of Titus Andronicus. From January to July 2014, Boxer played the role of Gloucester in William Shakespeare's King Lear. Between October 2016 to March 2017, he worked with From Software to voice the character and boss enemy Slave Knight Gael in the video game Dark Souls III, specifically its DLC Ashes of Ariandel and The Ringed City. He recently played Captain Rivers in the stage adaptation of Pat Barker's Booker-prize nominated novel Regeneration.

In 2018 Boxer played The Chairman in the Netflix series finale of Sense8. In the 4th season of the historical drama series The Crown Boxer played Denis Thatcher alongside Gillian Anderson as Margaret Thatcher.

References

External links
 

1950 births
English male soap opera actors
People educated at Magdalen College School, Oxford
Living people